John Porter Gaston (June 22, 1930 – January 14, 2013) was an American politician. He served as a Democratic member of the South Carolina House of Representatives.

Life and career 
Gaston attended Lewisville High School and Clemson University.

In 1971, Gaston was elected to the South Carolina House of Representatives, representing Chester County, South Carolina.

Gaston died in January 2013, at the age of 82.

References 

1930 births
2013 deaths
Democratic Party members of the South Carolina House of Representatives
20th-century American politicians
Clemson University alumni